At least three vessels have been named Eliza Stewart. 

 was a sailing ship that traded with Australia, China, and India and was last listed in 1843, having wrecked in January 1844.
, of 97 tons (bm), was launched at Saint Thomas. She was carrying coals from Newcastle to Cadiz when she foundered on 21 July 1861 off the Humber.
 was a merchant ship that also between 1851 and 1853 carried coolies between India and Trinidad; she was wrecked circa 1865.

Citations

Ship names